An indoor triathlon is a nonstandard variation of the triathlon and consists of three events: swimming, cycling, and running. The swim is held in an indoor pool, the cycling takes place on stationary bikes, and the run takes place on an indoor track or treadmill. Indoor triathlons are generally held in fitness clubs to accommodate all three sports.

In some competitions participants are judged by the distance they travel in each event in a set amount of time. Times can vary between races. On other occasions, the triathlon is conducted in the same manner as an outdoor triathlon in that distances are set and participants compete to finish the total distance in the shortest amount of time. Generally, the swimming is the shortest event, and cycling is the longest. Occasionally, transition time will not be factored into the overall scoring. In one example, participants are given about 5 minutes to transition between events.

An indoor triathlon has several advantages when compared to an outdoor triathlon.  Indoor triathlons are a way to compete during the winter, as well as a way to be introduced to the sport without facing an open water swim.  They also do not require an investment in a bicycle, as the bike portion is on a supplied stationary bike.  Finally, they also allow participants that may not be able to complete a set distance but that could "race" for a set period of time to compete.

The first indoor triathlons were held in stadiums and velodromes in Europe and Asia in the late 1980s as showcase events for the top professionals where a temporary pool would be built in the center and the bike and run would be around the track.  These were invitation-only spectator events with qualifying heats and a final race for professional triathletes and were not open to the general public.  Unlike the current format of indoor triathlons, these races did not have a short break between events, so transitions were an important element of the race. Borrowing from that concept, the first editions of the current version of the indoor triathlon were staged in the early 1990s in Ontario, Canada.  There a group of 4 triathlete friends created an indoor series based out of the 4 different universities they attended (University of Western Ontario, MacMaster University, Queens University and Trent University).  The races consisted of a 15-minute indoor pool swim followed by a 5-minute break to get from pool to bikes followed by a 15-minute bike on a stationary bike followed by a 5-minute break to get from bikes to the track followed by a 15-minute run on an indoor track.  The events were held with participants going in waves over the course of a morning.  Participants were scored based on point scale where you could achieve up to 1,000 points in each sport based on how far you went in the 15 minutes.  In contrast to the original professionally focused indoor races, the purpose of this series was to create a low cost, fun, safe and unstressful way to initiate newcomers to the sport of triathlon.  These races sold out quickly, and the series expanded to other universities and the Ontario InterUniversity Triathlon Association (OITA) was born to oversee it.  As triathlon's popularity grew in the 90s, other indoor triathlon races began appearing across North America and the world using a similar format to the OITA races.

Gallery

References

Triathlon
Endurance games